Agrasen High School (AHS) located in Yerwada, Pune, India, started on 12 July 1984. It is an unaided, co-educational, government-recognized, private school run by Shree Agrasen Charitable Trust. The school has laboratories, a library, a music room, a tailoring room, and a computer lab. There are sports activities arranged for the students.

Students are divided into four houses - red, blue, yellow and green. Sports activities are carried out between these houses.

The school has a well-developed infrastructure and it manages more than 3500 students per year.

Departments 
Kindergarten
Primary
Higher Secondary

See also 
List of schools in Pune
Agrasen High School, Pune

References 

Schools in Pune
1984 establishments in Maharashtra
Educational institutions established in 1984
Private schools in Maharashtra
Memorials to Agrasen